Kelly McCorkle Parkison, (born December 27, 1979) held the title of Miss South Carolina 2002 and placed in the Top 15 at the Miss America 2003 Pageant held on September 21, 2002, in Atlantic City, NJ.  She also competed in The Amazing Race 7 with then boyfriend Ron Young and placed 3rd overall.

Pageants
She competed at Miss South Carolina 2002 as Miss Golden Corner and was both a Preliminary Swimsuit and Preliminary Talent winner.  This was her third try at the Miss South Carolina title.  She was a 23-year-old cum laude graduate of North Greenville College, who was working as a spokesperson at the time that she won the Miss South Carolina title.  Her platform was learning disabilities, which she chose because she had a learning disability and was told that she would never graduate from high school or go to college.  Her talent was Lyrical Ballet.  She placed in the Top 15 at the Miss America 2003 pageant. McCorkle is the half-sister of Courtney Cisson, Miss South Carolina's Outstanding Teen 2008.

The Amazing Race
In 2004, she competed on The Amazing Race 7 with her boyfriend, Ron Young, a former Iraq War prisoner of war. They met after Ron was rescued by the United States Marines and during her reign as Miss South Carolina 2002. They had been dating ever since. At the time of The Amazing Race, she had been working as a legislative correspondent.  They decided to compete in The Amazing Race because they wanted to experience adventure. They ended up staying on the show until the very end, placing 3rd overall. They broke up after season was done filming.

The Amazing Race 7 finishes

An  placement with a double-dagger indicates that Ron and Kelly were the last to arrive at a pit stop in a non-elimination leg.
 An italicized placement means it was Ron and Kelly's placement at the midpoint of a double leg.
A  indicates Ron and Kelly were on the receiving end of the Yield.

Roadblocks performed by McCorkle are bolded 

Notes

References

The Amazing Race (American TV series) contestants
Miss America 2003 delegates
People from Greenville, South Carolina
Greenville College people
Living people
1979 births